Francis (Frank) Durning SM was a New Zealand priest of the Roman Catholic Church.

Durning was born in Glasgow on 12 May 1914, and his family emigrated to New Zealand. He was ordained as a priest with the Society of Mary (Marist) on 11 December 1938.

Durning taught in Catholic institutions from the 1940s through to the late 1980s, among others at:
 St Bede's College, Christchurch 
 Chanel College, Moamoa, in Samoa
 St Patrick's College, Silverstream, where he was Rector of the school from 1950-1955
 St Patrick's College, Kilbirnie, Wellington
Holy Cross College, Mosgiel

Durning died on 13 April 1999.

In 2018 the Society of Mary said that Francis Durning sexually abused children.

References

1914 births
Clergy from Glasgow
1999 deaths
New Zealand Roman Catholic priests
Catholic Church sexual abuse scandals in New Zealand